The John H. Lewis Gymnasium is a 7,000 seat venue on the campus of Morris Brown College.  It was home to the Atlanta Thoroughbreds National Indoor Football League team, and in the fall of 2007 will be home to the Atlanta Krunk Wolverines Continental Basketball Association team.

Indoor arenas in Georgia (U.S. state)
Sports venues in Atlanta
Basketball venues in Georgia (U.S. state)
Continental Basketball Association venues